Herman of Valaam is a saint of the Russian Orthodox Church. Herman of Valaam together with Sergius of Valaam are considered to be the founders of the Valaam Monastery. The exact time of the monastery establishment is unknown and referred to the period from 10th to 15th century.

The saint preached Christianity to the tribes of Karelia in the North of the present Russia and led other missionary activities.

Herman of Valaam, by different sources was of Karelian or Greek origin.

The memory of saints Herman of Valaam and Sergius of Valaam is commemorated by the Russian Orthodox Church on July, 11th, see June 28 (Eastern Orthodox liturgics).

References

 Saints Sergius and Herman of Valaam / Ortodoksi.net

Burials at Valaam Monastery
Christian missionaries in Finland
Eastern Orthodox missionaries
Russian saints of the Eastern Orthodox Church
Miracle workers

es:Herman de Valaam